Local elections were held in Marikina on May 13, 2013 within the Philippine general election. The voters will elect for the elective local posts in the city: the mayor, vice mayor, two district representatives, and councilors, eight in each of the city's two legislative districts.

Results
Names in boldface denote re-electionist candidates.

District Representatives

1st District

2nd District

Mayor

Vice Mayor

City Councilors

1st District

|-bgcolor=black
|colspan=5|

2nd District

|-bgcolor=black
|colspan=5|

References

2013 Philippine local elections
Elections in Marikina
Politics of Marikina
2013 elections in Metro Manila